The PT Mi-Ba-III is a large Bakelite cased circular Czechoslovakian anti-tank blast mine. It is no longer produced but it is found in Angola, Kuwait, Mozambique, and Namibia. A Bulgarian copy of the mine, the PMT-BA-III exists.

Specifications
 Diameter: 330 mm
 Height: 101 mm
 Weight: 9.9 kg
 Explosive content: 7.2 kg of TNT
 Fuze: RO-2 or RO-7-I

References
 Jane's Mines and Mine Clearance 2005-2006
 

Anti-tank mines
Land mines of Czechoslovakia